Water sachets or sachet water   is a common form of selling pre-filtered or sanitized water in plastic, heat sealed bags in parts of the global south, and are especially popular in Africa. Water sachets are cheaper to produce than plastic bottles, and easier to transport. In some countries, water vendors refer to sachet water as "pure water".

High demand, and poor collection of waste from consumers, has resulted in significant plastic pollution and waste from sachets throughout the West Africa. Accumulation of sachets frequently causes blocked stormwater drainage, and other issues. Some countries, such as Senegal, have banned disposable sachets.

Because sachets are frequently filled in small and often unregulated facilities, inadequate sanitary conditions can occasionally result in disease or contamination. However, in countries like Ghana consumers still prefer that access over other forms of venders, with a perception of lower risk. This form of water distribution provides vital access to water in communities that otherwise wouldn't have it. However, some scholars have identified this method of distribution as having potential human rights and social justice issues, limiting the right to water and sanitation.

Health concerns 

Studies of sachets frequently find improper sanitary conditions among sachet producers. One study of sachets in Port Harcourt, Nigeria found that sachet water has significant contamination from various disease causing microbes. Prolonged storage of the sachets found human-health threatening levels of the microbes after 4 months in several of the samples. Similarly following the onset of the COVID pandemic, in Damongo found 96% of producers didn't have adequate sanitary measures.

By Country

Ghana 

Sachet water is common through Ghana. A 2012 review of sachet use in Ghana found sachet water ubiquitous especially in poorer communities. Sachets were typically 500 ml polyethylene bags, and heat sealed at each end. Sachet water delivery is part of a larger trend in delivery by private water vendors from municipal taps.

Packaging water in small plastics bags started in the 1990s, and that practice grew after the introduction of Chinese machines for filling and heat sealing bags. A price increase in 2022, saw significant changes in the sales in the Ashanti region.

Nigeria 

Sachet water has become increasingly important part of the water access in Nigeria, especially fast growing cities like Lagos. The cost of Sachet water is dependent on economic changes.  In 2021, the

Association for Table Water Producers of Nigeria increased the price of bag of sachet water to 200 naira due to increase in production cost. A significant devaluation of local currency led to significant price increases in 2022.

See also 
Drinking water
Purified water
Self-supply of water and sanitation
WASH - Water supply, sanitation and hygiene
Water kiosk

References 

Water
Plastics